Steevan Humberto Fortes dos Santos (born 17 September 1989), also known as "Duba", is a Cape Verdean footballer who plays as a forward for Union Omaha of USL League One.

Career
Duba began his career in his native Cape Verde with CS Mindelense, before moving to Norway with Ullensaker/Kisa IL in 2012. After a short period with Angola's Progresso, Duba signed with United Soccer League club Rochester Rhinos on March 27, 2015.

After two seasons with Ottawa Fury FC, Duba joined Pittsburgh Riverhounds SC on 8 January 2019 on a one-year deal.

On December 24, 2020, it was announced that Duba would join USL Championship side Tampa Bay Rowdies ahead of their 2021 season. He was released by Tampa following their 2022 season.

Dos Santos signed with Union Omaha on February 7, 2023.

References

External links
 Rhinos profile

1989 births
Living people
Association football forwards
Cape Verdean footballers
CS Mindelense players
Ullensaker/Kisa IL players
Progresso Associação do Sambizanga players
Rochester New York FC players
Ottawa Fury FC players
Pittsburgh Riverhounds SC players
Tampa Bay Rowdies players
Union Omaha players
Norwegian First Division players
USL Championship players
USL League One players
Expatriate footballers in Norway
Expatriate footballers in Angola
Expatriate soccer players in the United States
Expatriate soccer players in Canada
Cape Verdean expatriate footballers
Cape Verdean expatriate sportspeople in Norway
Cape Verdean expatriate sportspeople in Angola
Cape Verdean expatriate sportspeople in the United States
Cape Verdean expatriate sportspeople in Canada
People from Mindelo